2012–13 Hong Kong Senior Challenge Shield is the 111th season of one of the Asian oldest football knockout competitions, Hong Kong Senior Challenge Shield. The competition will be played in a two-legged tie, except for the final, which will be played in one match at Hong Kong Stadium. The winner will guarantee a place in the 2013 Hong Kong AFC Cup play-offs.

Wofoo Tai Po won their first Senior Shield title as they defeated Citizen in the final by penalty shoot-out.

Calendar

Bracket
The following bracket doesn't show first round matches.

Fixtures and results

First round

Quarter-finals

Semi-finals

Final

MATCH OFFICIALS
Assistant referees:
Chow Chun Kit
Lam Chi Ho
Fourth official: Ng Kai Lam
LP Local Player
FP Foreign Player

MATCH RULES
90 minutes. (1st Half Added Time: 1 min, 2nd Half Added Time: 5 mins)
30 minutes of extra-time if necessary.
Penalty shoot-out if scores still level.
Seven named substitutes
Maximum of 3 substitutions.

Remarks:
1 The capacity of Aberdeen Sports Ground is originally 9,000, but only the 4,000-seated main stand is opened for football match.

Scorers
The scorers in the 2012–13 Hong Kong Senior Challenge Shield are as follows:

5 goals
  Alex Tayo Akande (Wofoo Tai Po)

3 goals
  Clayton Michel Afonso (Wofoo Tai Po)

2 goals

  Detinho (Citizen)
  Festus Baise (Citizen)
  Paulinho Piracicaba (Citizen)
  So Loi Keung (Citizen)
  Yuan Yang (Citizen)
  Yuto Nakamura (Citizen)
  Aender Naves Mesquita (Wofoo Tai Po)
  To Hon To (Wofoo Tai Po)
  Mauricio Correa Da Luz (Tuen Mun)

1 goal

  Hrvoje Komar (Biu Chun Rangers)
  Michael Campion (Citizen)
  Sham Kwok Keung (Citizen)
  Boris Si (Citizen)
  Tam Lok Hin (Citizen)
  Itaparica (South China)
  Lee Wai Lim (South China)
  Mauro Rafael da Silva (South China)
  Chan Cheuk Kwong (Southern)
  Chow Ka Wa (Southern)
  Jonathan Carril (Southern)
  Rubén López García-Madrid (Southern)
  Thiago Constância (Sun Pegasus)
  Christian Annan (Sun Pegasus)
  Cheung Kin Fung (Sunray Cave JC Sun Hei)
  Ye Jia (Wofoo Tai Po)
  Beto (Tuen Mun)

Prizes

External links
 Senior Shield - Hong Kong Football Association

2012-13
Shield
2012–13 domestic association football cups